Applegarthtown, also known as Applegarth or Applegirth, is a village near Lockerbie in Annandale, Dumfries and Galloway, Scotland.

The name is derived from the Old Norse and means "apple-yard" or "orchard". Edward I of England offered oblation at a chapel in the parish in 1300 on his way to Caerlaverock.

The primary school was founded by the Jardine family in the 19th century and was renovated and reopened in 1994.

The Jardine chiefs were established at Applegarth by the fourteenth century, The 7th Baronet of Applegirth, Sir William Jardine (1800–1874), was a well known naturalist and geologist. The original seat of the Jardines of Applegarth was at Spedlins Tower, constructed in the 15th century over the site of a previous tower which had been the family seat since the 12th century. In the early 19th Century the family seat was moved across the River Annan to Jardine Hall.

The Applegarthtown Wildlife Sanctuary at nearby Dryfeholm was established in 1984 by converting a piece of low productivity agricultural land into a wetland to attract resident and migratory birds. An artificial sand bank was also created and this was colonised by sand martins. This has allowed scientists to study the breeding behaviour of these birds and has provided an example which has been replicated elsewhere.

References

Villages in Dumfries and Galloway
Parishes in Dumfries and Galloway